Bulugh al-Maram min Adillat al-Ahkam, translation: Attainment of the Objective According to Evidences of the Ordinances by al-Hafidh ibn Hajar al-Asqalani (1372 – 1448) is a collection of hadith pertaining specifically to Shafi'i jurisprudence. This genre is referred to in Arabic as Ahadith al-Ahkam.

About
Bulugh al-Maram contains a total of 1358 hadiths. At the end of each hadith narrated in Bulugh al-Maram, al-Hafidh ibn Hajar mentions who collected that hadith originally. Bulugh al-Maram includes hadith drawn from numerous primary sources of hadith in it including, Sahih al-Bukhari, Sahih Muslim, Sunan Abu Dawud, Jami at-Tirmidhi, Sunan al-Nasa'i,  Sunan ibn Majah, and Musnad Ahmad ibn Hanbal and more.

It holds a unique distinction as all the hadith compiled in the book have been the foundation for Shafi'i Islamic Jurisprudence rulings.  In addition to mentioning the origins of each of the hadith in Bulugh al-Maram, ibn Hajar also included a comparison between the versions of a hadith that came from different sources.  Because of its unique qualities, it still remains a widely used collection of hadith regardless of school of thought.

Contents
The book is divided into 15 chapters:
 The Book of Purification
 The Book of Prayer
 The Book of Funerals
 The Book of Zakat
 The Book of Siyam
 The Book of Business Transactions
 The Book of Marriage
 The Book of Jinayat
 The Book of Hudud
 The Book of Jihad
 The Book of Foods
 The Book of Oaths and Vows
 The Book of Judgement
 The Book of Emancipation 
 The Comprehensive Book

Explanations
 Al-Badr al-Tamam by al-Husain ibn Muhammad al-Maghribi
 Subul al-Salam by Muhammad ibn Ismail al-Amir al-Sana'ni, who abridged al-Badr al-Tamam

Translation
 Bulugh Al-Maram: Attainment of the Objective According to Evidence of the Ordinances, Dar-us-Salam; 1st edition (1996), ASIN: B000FJJURU

Other books of Ahadith al-ahkam
Tahdhib al-Athar by Muhammad ibn Jarir al-Tabari
Sunan al-Wusta by Ahmad Bayhaqi
Sunan al-Kubra by Ahmad Bayhaqi
‘Umdah al-ahkam by Abd al-Ghani al-Maqdisi
Al-Muntaqa by Majd ibn Taymiyah explained by Muhammad ash-Shawkani in Nayl al-Awtar Sharh Muntaqa al-Akhbar

Publications
 Bulugh Al-Maram: Attainment of the Objective According to Evidence of the Ordinances

References

External links
 Bulugh al-Maram (partial) online at Sunnah.com

Hadith
Sunni literature
Sunni hadith collections